is a song by the Japanese rock band Asian Kung-Fu Generation. It was the second single released from their second full-length studio album, Sol-fa, on May 19, 2004.

The song was used as the theme song for the drama Dame Nari! and, in the following year, it was used in Osu! Tatakae! Ouendan, a Japanese rhythm game released on Nintendo DS.

Music video
The music video for "Loop & Loop" was co-directed by Kazuyoshi Oku and Masafumi Gotoh. The PV takes place within a classroom populated by four young boys. Over the course of the video, the students ride bikes, play jumprope, and pretend to be a band using brooms for guitars. All the while, they listen to headphones and lip-sync the lyrics to the song. In Eizō Sakuhinshū Vol. 1, it showed the boy at the beginning listening to CD called Romance (ロマンス) by Takamitsu Shibuyama (渋山貴光) (Takahiro Yamada's pseudonym) and at the end, it change with Loop & Loop's cover. However, they cut the both scenes in their official Youtube.

Track listing

Personnel
Masafumi Gotoh – lead vocals, rhythm guitar
Kensuke Kita – lead guitar, background vocals
Takahiro Yamada –  bass guitar, background vocals
Kiyoshi Ijichi – drums
Asian Kung-Fu Generation – producer
Tohru Takayama – mixing
Mitsuharu Harada – mastering
Kenichi Nakamura – recording
Yusuke Nakamura – single cover art

Charts

References

Asian Kung-Fu Generation songs
2004 singles
Songs written by Masafumi Gotoh
Japanese television drama theme songs
2004 songs
Ki/oon Music singles